Coley is an electoral ward of the Borough of Reading, in the English county of Berkshire. Until the 2022 Reading Borough Council election, it was known as Minster ward and had slightly different boundaries.

It lies south-west of the town centre, comprising all or parts of the suburbs of Coley, Coley Park, and West Reading, together with a large tract of undeveloped River Kennet flood-plain to the south. From the south in clockwise order it is bounded by the River Kennet, the Reading to Basingstoke railway line, Reading West railway station, the Oxford Road, Prospect Street, Tilehust Road, Castle Hill, and the A33 back to the River Kennet. The ward is bordered, in the same order, by Whitley, Southcote, Battle, Abbey and Katesgrove wards. It lies entirely within the Reading West parliamentary constituency.

The principal changes to the ward boundary in 2022 were the loss of the section of the old Minster ward to the west of the railway line, bounded by Bath Road, Parkside Road and Tilehurst Road, to Southcote ward, and the loss of the strip of Minster ward to the east of the A33, as far as the River Kennet, to Katesgrove ward. Coley ward also gained the area bounded by Tilehurst Road, Reading West station, Oxford Road and Prospect Street from Battle ward.

As of 2016, there were just over 10,000 people living in Minster ward, of whom 21% were aged under 16, 12.6% were aged 65 and over, and 29% were born outside the UK. The population lived in a total of just under 4,700 dwellings, of which almost 50% were in purpose-built blocks of flats, and around 20% each were terraced houses or semi-detached houses, with detached houses and flat conversions making up the rest. Of the population aged between 16 and 74, approximately 70% were in employment and 5.5% were unemployed. Of those in employment, 50% were in managerial, professional or technical occupations, with 26% in professional occupations.

As with all Reading wards, the ward elects three councillors to Reading Borough Council.  Elections since 2004 are generally held by thirds, with elections in three years out of four, although the 2022 elections were for all councillors due to the boundary changes. The ward councillors are currently Ellie Emberson, Paul Gittings and Liz Terry, all of whom are members of the Labour party.

References

Wards of Reading